Mladen Ramljak (1 July 1945 – 13 September 1978) was a Croatian football defender.

Club career
Ramljak left Dinamo Zagreb for Dutch side Feyenoord after playing over 600 games for the club. He moved to AZ '67 after three seasons in Rotterdam, but never played for AZ as his career got cut short due to injury.

International career
He made his debut for Yugoslavia in a May 1966 friendly match against Hungary and earned a total of 13 caps, scoring no goals. He was a participant at Euro 1968 and his final international was a May 1972 European Championship qualification match away against the Soviet Union.

Death and legacy
Mladen Ramljak died in a road accident near Novska. Dinamo Zagreb holds an international memorial tournament in his honour for youth squads.

References

External links
 
Mladen Ramljak at the Serbia national football team website 

1945 births
1978 deaths
Footballers from Zagreb
Association football defenders
Yugoslav footballers
Yugoslavia international footballers
UEFA Euro 1968 players
GNK Dinamo Zagreb players
Feyenoord players
AZ Alkmaar players
UEFA Cup winning players
Yugoslav First League players
Eredivisie players
Yugoslav expatriate footballers
Expatriate footballers in the Netherlands
Yugoslav expatriate sportspeople in the Netherlands
Road incident deaths in Yugoslavia
Burials at Mirogoj Cemetery